Condensate is the fifth studio album by the American funk ensemble The Original 7ven, formerly known as The Time.  Released on October 18, 2011, the album was the group's first release in 21 years. Condensate peaked at number 58 on the U.S. Billboard 200 album chart and number 10 on the U.S. Top R&B/Hip-Hop Albums chart. "#Trendin" was also released as a single and reached number 77 on the U.S. Hot R&B/Hip-Hop Songs chart.

Track listing
 All songs written by James Harris III and Terry Lewis, except as noted.

Personnel
The Time
 Morris Day – lead and backing vocals
 Jesse Johnson – guitar, backing vocals
 Jimmy Jam – keyboards, backing vocals
 Monte Moir – keyboards, backing vocals
 Terry Lewis – bass, backing and additional lead vocals
 Jerome Benton – percussion, backing vocals
 Jellybean Johnson – drums, percussion

Additional Personnel
 Sue Ann Carwell: backing vocals
 Treasure Davis: backing vocals
 Carla Carter: backing vocals
 Matt Marrin, Tremaine Williams, Jesse Johnson: Recording engineer
 Matt Marrin, Jesse Johnson: Mixing
 Jimmy Jam, Terry Lewis, Mike Jason, Michael Mitchell, Bruce Walker: Executive producer
 Robert Vosgien: Mastering
 Christopher Voelker: Photography
 Phil Yarnall: Design

Notes

The Time (band) albums
2011 albums
Albums produced by Jimmy Jam and Terry Lewis